Volleyball events were contested at the 1990 Asian Games in Chaoyang Gymnasium, Beijing, China from 23 September 1990 to 5 October 1990.

Medalists

Medal table

Final standing

Men

Women

References
 Results Men
 Results Women

 
1990 Asian Games events
1990
Asian Games
1990 Asian Games